"Here I Am" is a song written by Tony Arata, and recorded by American country music artist Patty Loveless. It was released in November 1994 as the second single from her seventh album, When Fallen Angels Fly (1994). The song reached a number four peak in February 1995.

Critical reception
Richard McVey from Cash Box wrote, "A far cry from her previous release, “I Try To Think About Elvis”, this easy-paced, guitar/vocally-driven tune is classic Loveless. She pours out emotions through her vocals like few can and “Here I Am” is no exception."

Music video
The accompanying music video for "Here I am" premiered in December 1994.

Charts

Weekly charts

Year-end charts

References

1994 singles
1994 songs
Patty Loveless songs
Songs written by Tony Arata
Song recordings produced by Emory Gordy Jr.
Epic Records singles